Chaetoderma is a genus of fungi in the Stereaceae family. It contains two species, both found in Europe.

References

Russulales genera
Stereaceae